Vladimír Slanina Sr. (born 12 May 1969) is a Czech male canoeist who won a medal at senior level at the Wildwater Canoeing World Championships.

He is the father of Vladimír Slanina, canoeist too.

Medals at the World Championships
Senior

References

External links
 

1969 births
Living people
Czech male canoeists
Place of birth missing (living people)